The flag of the British Overseas Territory of Bermuda as a red ensign was first adopted on 4 October 1910. It is a British Red Ensign with the Union Flag (which is the national flag) in the upper left corner, and the coat of arms of Bermuda in the lower right. Prior to this like most of the British colonies at the time it adopted a blue ensign with a seal that depicted a dry dock with three sailing ships. In 1999, the flag was changed to its current form, with an enlarged coat of arms.

Description
The flag is unusual for a British overseas territory in that it is used on land in a red ensign form; most other British overseas territories use a version of the blue ensign for general use ashore. Bermuda's use of a red ensign on land is in keeping with Canada (pre-1965) and the Union of South Africa (pre-1928), both of which used red ensigns ashore as local flags in the early part of the 20th century. Bermuda's flag is an appropriate civil ensign for vessels registered on the Bermuda portion of the British Register, by virtue of the Bermuda Merchant Shipping Act of 2002. The Governor of Bermuda uses a Union Flag defaced with the coat of arms, a design traditional for Governors of the British overseas territories. For the state ensign, a blue ensign is used.

Coat of arms
The Latin inscription on the coat of arms reads Quo Fata Ferunt ("Whither the Fates Carry"). The coat of arms shows a lion holding a shield which bears a picture of a shipwreck on a rock.

See also

 List of British flags

References

External links

 
 Flag and Ensign of Bermuda
 Presentation of Bermuda Regiment Colours

Flag
National flags
Red Ensigns
Flags of British Overseas Territories
Bermuda
Bermuda
Bermuda
Bermuda